Britt Marianne Strandberg (later Lundén, born 31 March 1934) is a former Swedish cross-country skier. She competed at the 1960, 1964 and 1968 Winter Olympics in the 3 × 5 km relay and 5 and 10 km events. She won three medals in the relay with a gold in 1960 and silvers in 1964 and 1968. Her best individual result was fourth place over 10 km in 1964, only 7.4 seconds behind the bronze medal.

Strandberg also won 3 × 5 km relay medals at the FIS Nordic World Ski Championships with a silver in 1962 and a bronze in 1966.

Cross-country skiing results
All results are sourced from the International Ski Federation (FIS).

Olympic Games
 3 medals – (1 gold, 2 silver)

World Championships
 2 medals – (1 silver, 1 bronze)

References

External links

 
 
 

1934 births
Living people
Swedish female cross-country skiers
Cross-country skiers at the 1960 Winter Olympics
Cross-country skiers at the 1964 Winter Olympics
Cross-country skiers at the 1968 Winter Olympics
Olympic gold medalists for Sweden
Olympic silver medalists for Sweden
Olympic medalists in cross-country skiing
FIS Nordic World Ski Championships medalists in cross-country skiing
Medalists at the 1960 Winter Olympics
Medalists at the 1964 Winter Olympics
Medalists at the 1968 Winter Olympics
20th-century Swedish women